Music by Night is a 1953 German comedy film directed by Kurt Hoffmann and starring Paul Hubschmid, Gertrud Kückelmann and Curd Jürgens. It was shot at the Bavaria Studios in Munich. The film's sets were designed by the art director Robert Herlth.

Cast 
 Paul Hubschmid as Robert Ellin
 Gertrud Kückelmann as Maria Bruck
 Curd Jürgens as Hans Kersten
 Judith Holzmeister as Gloria Ellin
 Günther Lüders as George Webb
 Rudolf Vogel as Joseph, Oberkellner
 Hans Reiser as Teddy Taylor
 Rudolf Reiff as Dr. Reissner, Verleger
 Harry Hertzsch as Diener John
 Heinz-Leo Fischer as Manager Miller

References

Bibliography
 Bock, Hans-Michael & Bergfelder, Tim. The Concise CineGraph. Encyclopedia of German Cinema. Berghahn Books, 2009.

External links 

1953 musical comedy films
German musical comedy films
West German films
Films directed by Kurt Hoffmann
1953 films
1950s German-language films
Films shot at Bavaria Studios
German black-and-white films
1950s German films